Kumarkhali is an upazila of Kushtia District in the Division of Khulna, Bangladesh. It is famous for the Shelaidaha area, where the poet Rabindranath Tagore  spent a considerable time of his youth.

Geography
It has 48387 households and total area 265.89 km2.

Demographics
According to 2011 Bangladesh census, Kumarkhali had a population of 328,457. Males constituted 49.77% of the population and females 50.23. Muslims formed 96.757% of the population, Hindus 3.297%, Christians 0.005% and others 0.003%. Kumarkhali had a literacy rate of 45.3% for the population 7 years and above.

At the 1991 Bangladesh census Kumarkhali had a population of 269,008, of whom 133,845  were aged 18 or older. Males constituted 51.77% of the population, and females 48.23%. Kumarkhali had an average literacy rate of 24.9% (7+ years), against the national average of 32.4%.

Administration
Kumarkhali Upazila is divided into Kumarkhali Municipality and 11 union parishads: Bagulat, Chandpur, Chapra, Jadu Boyra, Jagannathpur, Kaya, Nandalalpur, Panti, Sadaki, Sadipur, and Shelaidaha. The union parishads are subdivided into 187 mauzas and 201 villages.

Kumarkhali Municipality is subdivided into 9 wards and 17 mahallas.

See also
Upazilas of Bangladesh
Districts of Bangladesh
Divisions of Bangladesh

References

Upazilas of Kushtia District
Kushtia District
Khulna Division